Thomas Grant Bohanon (born September 10, 1990) is a former American football fullback and special teamer. He played college football at Wake Forest and was drafted by the New York Jets in the seventh round of the 2013 NFL Draft. He has also been a member of the Jacksonville Jaguars.

Early years
Bohanon attended North Fort Myers High School in North Fort Myers, Florida. He earned all-district, all-conference and all-area honors in each of his final three years of high school. He was named MVP of the Carrigan All-Star Football Classic in December 2008.

College career
Bohanon played college football at Wake Forest as a fullback from 2009 to 2012. In the 2009 season, he appeared in nine games and had 16 carries for 51 rushing yards to go along with eight receptions for 66 receiving yards and a receiving touchdown. In the 2010 season, he appeared in 11 games and had 17 carries for 77 rushing yards to go along with 10 receptions for 76 receiving yards. In the 2011 season, he finished with 15 carries for 31 rushing yards and two rushing touchdowns to go along with nine receptions for 56 receiving yards and a receiving touchdown. In his final collegiate season in 2012, he had 23 receptions for 208 receiving yards and five receiving touchdowns. He finished his collegiate career with a total of 51 receptions, 405 receiving yards, seven receiving touchdowns, 160 rushing yards, and three career rushing touchdowns.

Professional career

New York Jets
The New York Jets selected Bohanon in the seventh round (215th overall) of the 2013 NFL Draft. He was the last of three fullbacks selected in 2013, behind Harvard's Kyle Juszczyk and Kansas State's Braden Wilson.

2013 season
On May 10, 2013, the New York Jets signed Bohanon to four-year, $2.22 million contract that includes a signing bonus of $62,248.

Throughout training camp, Bohanon competed against Lex Hilliard for the job as the starting fullback that was left vacant following the departure of John Conner. Head coach Rex Ryan named Bohanon the starting fullback to begin the regular season.

The Jets finished the season with an 8–8 record despite not making the playoffs. Bohanon finished with 17 carries for 62 yards as well as 11 receptions for 69 yards. He also returned one kickoff for 15 yards. Bohanon gave the Jets a reliable receiver out of the backfield and a good short yardage back.

2014 season
In Week 4 against the Detroit Lions, Bohanon suffered a broken collar bone, which required surgery, and was placed in injured reserve for the remainder of the 2014 year. In four games, Bohanon rushed for three yards and recorded 30 receiving yards.

2015 season
Bohanon was the starting fullback for the Jets in 2015. He finished with four receptions for 56 receiving yards. He was the lead blocker to help Chris Ivory become the AFC's leading rusher with 1,070 rushing yards.

On September 3, 2016, Bohanon was released by the Jets as part of final roster cuts.

Jacksonville Jaguars
On April 17, 2017, the Jacksonville Jaguars signed Bohanon to a two-year, $1.48 million contract, reuniting him with former Jets' teammate Chris Ivory. On September 10, in the 29–7 season opening victory over the Houston Texans, Bohanon recorded his first career touchdown on a one-yard pass from quarterback Blake Bortles.

On December 17, in the 45–7 victory over the Houston Texans, Bohanon recorded two rushing touchdowns, taking the ball in each time from the one-yard line. He finished the 2017 season with six receptions for 43 receiving yards and a receiving touchdown to go along with five carries for five rushing yards and two rushing touchdowns. The Jaguars won the AFC South and made the playoffs. After a 10–3 victory over the Buffalo Bills in the Wild Card Round, he had a 14-yard receiving touchdown in the 45–42 victory over the Pittsburgh Steelers. In the AFC Championship, he had a 20-yard reception in the 24–20 loss.

Green Bay Packers

On August 12, 2019, Bohanon was signed by the Green Bay Packers. On August 30, 2019, Bohanon was waived by the Packers.

In October 2019, the newly-formed XFL held their opening season draft. Bohanon was selected by the New York Guardians in the draft's open phase.

Baltimore Ravens
Bohanon signed to the Baltimore Ravens' practice squad on December 4, 2020, and was released three days later. He re-signed to the practice squad on December 11, and was released again four days later.

NFL statistics

Personal life
Bohanon is the son of Thomas and Audrey Bohanon. He majored in communications at Wake Forest. Bohanon is married to his high school sweetheart Katie. Bohanon was given the Pop Warner Humanitarian Award at the 58th Annual All-American Scholars Banquet in June 2018. It recognizes players efforts on and off the field and is given to individuals who set a positive example for today's youth by accomplishing both outstanding athletic achievements and philanthropic initiatives. Tommy and his wife also developed the Tommy Bohanon Foundation to support at-risk youth in their Southwest Florida community through their organization's programs and scholarship opportunities.

References

External links
Jacksonville Jaguars bio
Wake Forest Demon Deacons bio 

1990 births
Living people
American football fullbacks
Baltimore Ravens players
Green Bay Packers players
Jacksonville Jaguars players
New York Jets players
People from North Fort Myers, Florida
Players of American football from Florida
Wake Forest Demon Deacons football players
Ed Block Courage Award recipients